Hàng Lâm Trang Anh (born January 14, 1990), known by her stage name Suboi, is a Vietnamese rapper, singer, and songwriter.

Raised in Ho Chi Minh City, where she lives, Suboi is the first Vietnamese female rapper to become successful in her country and is considered Vietnam's queen of hip hop.

Biography 

Suboi’s mother worked as an office worker at the Australian consulate in Saigon, and her father worked as a factory manager. Suboi revealed that she used to be a shy girl who spent much of her time on words and composing ridiculous poems.

Suboi gained her onstage name during middle school, “Su” being her nickname at home and “cu
” given to her by friends due to her tomboy nature. Growing up, she was a rebellious teenager who "got involved with some bad people" but turned to music for guidance.

She became a fan of hip hop music at the age of 14 and improved her English by listening and rapping along to famous American rappers such as Eminem. At the age of 15, she started spending time with people who she now considers bad guys, which worried her parents and made them keep a closer eye on her. She chose to have a career in music because it made her feel safe. She was also interested in skateboarding. She accepted an invitation to join a nu-metal band covering Linkin Park songs and quickly became a well-recognized and respected rapper from the Vietnamese underground scene.

Suboi used to work as an English teacher and a clown in children’s birthday parties to pursue her passion for rap. She believes the main elements that make a successful rapper are to never give up, listen to others, take advice, and learn. From the first days of her career, Suboi had difficulties finding her own message to audience and forming her own style. Her family and the audience’s preconception that rap is only for men were two big challenges to the very first Vietnamese female rapper. Though her parents support her now, they didn’t want their daughter to be a tomboy who always listened to rock, rap and read lyrics on beats.
At the age of 17, her talent was noticed even more so as she accompanied fellow rapper, Rapsoul, to Music Faces’ recording studio to record his track. However, it was her vocals that were noticed by the producer which then led to an invitation for her to join the record label.

Her mainstream recognition grew when she was invited to rap on Vietnamese pop star Ho Ngoc Ha's chart topping singles "My Apology" and "Girls' Night" in 2009.

At the age of 20, she released her debut album WALK in August 2010 which was well received both by her loyal fan base and music critics in Vietnam. After leaving her record label Music Faces in 2012, she began her own company, Suboi Entertainment, and released her second studio album entitled RUN in 2014. Run had beats produced by both local Vietnamese producers as well as international producers from England and the United States.

Suboi was invited to perform at CAAMFest 2014, the largest Asian American media showcase in the United States; however, she couldn’t come to the U.S since she had trouble getting her visa. Instead, she made her debut in America on March 13, 2015, co-headlining with Awkwafina, a female rapper from New York. She also made her debut as actress in CAAMFest 2015 in San Francisco, in "Hollow", a horror movie directed by Ham Tran. The film became a box office hit and led to her first starring role in 2016's "Bitcoin Heist", a Vietnamese heist film also directed by Ham Tran.

In 2015, she was invited to perform an official showcase at South by Southwest (SXSW), becoming the first Vietnamese artist ever to be officially invited by the festival. She performed to rave reviews and in 2016, she was invited back to perform at SXSW for the second year in a row.

In 2016, Suboi was rebuilding her musical career after what she considered a creative lull. She released a new single entitled "Doi" early in the year, showcasing a "dark beat" which she had been reluctant to release earlier in her career.

On May 25, 2016, Suboi came to immediate international media attention after rapping for President Barack Obama at a Q&A session with young leaders in Ho Chi Minh City. The brief exchange between Suboi and the US President prompted him to reflect on the history of rap music and the importance of art to a nation.

Artistry 

Suboi’s favorite kinds of music range from rock and rap to chamber music. Influenced by Eminem, Snoop Dogg, Linkin Park, Aaliyah, Kendrick Lamar among many others, her versatile rap style ranges from a laid-back delivery similar to Snoop Dogg to a fast paced style like Eminem. Asked about her style, she states "I can't pinpoint a particular style or artist but I'm a fan of Mos Def, Da Brat, Snoop Dogg, Aaliyah, Foxy Brown and the newest one Azealia Banks. I also enjoy everything nice from Norah Jones, Bob Marley, Erykah Badu, to German artist Kool Savas, Xavier Naidoo ... all of these artists' music have played a very important role in my personal life."
 She raps in both English and Vietnamese, making her different from most rappers in Vietnam. Her lyrics are typically outspoken yet introspective and deal with family, love, social pressure, and daily life in Vietnam.

Discography

Studio albums

Extended plays

Singles

As lead artist

As featured artist

References

External links
Official website
Suboi on Facebook
Suboi's channel on YouTube
Suboi channel on Instagram

1990 births
Living people
Hip hop singers
Vietnamese women rappers
Vietnamese idols
People from Ho Chi Minh City
Women in electronic music
21st-century Vietnamese women singers
21st-century women rappers